David James Oakley (born 28 November 1955) is the Roman Catholic Bishop of Northampton.

Born in Stourbridge on 28 November 1955, he was ordained as a priest on 5 July 1980 for the Archdiocese of Birmingham. From February 2013 to 2020, he served as Rector of St Mary's College, Oscott, the seminary of the Archdiocese of Birmingham.

He was appointed the Bishop of the Diocese of Northampton by the Holy See on 8 January 2020. His consecration to the episcopate took place at Northampton Cathedral on 19 March 2020; the principal consecrator was Cardinal Vincent Nichols, Archbishop of Westminster.

References

1955 births
21st-century Roman Catholic bishops in England
Living people
Roman Catholic bishops of Northampton
English Roman Catholic bishops